Dharmapala or Dom João Dharmapala Peria Bandara (1541 – 27 May 1597) was last king of the Kingdom of Kotte, in present-day Sri Lanka, from 1551 until 27 May 1597. He is also known as  Dom João Dharmapala, the first Christian king in Sri Lankan history. He is widely known as the last true King and ruler of the capital city Kotte; under Portuguese military occupation, he attempted to reorganise his military and pursue a treaty with the Portuguese to save the Sinhalese Kingdom.

Birth 
Dom João Dharmapala (Don John Dharmapala) was born as the eldest child of Weediye Bandara, a Prince from Madampe and his wife Samudra Devi, daughter of King Bhuvanekabãhu VII the King of Kotte. His exact date of birth is unknown, but the year is commonly regarded as 1541. A golden statue was sent to Portugal to be crowned by the Portuguese. It was sent by his predecessor King Bhuvanekabahu VII.

Personal life
He had a younger brother, Prince Wijayapala. And a younger half-brother Prince Sooriyabandara from his father's second marriage. 
His mother was murdered by his father when he was young, so his maternal grandfather King Bhuvanekabahu VII raised him under the supervision of the Portuguese. 

First, he married Princess Isabella of Kandy, daughter of King Jayaweera Wickramabahu of Kandy. After she died, he married Queen Dona Isabella's niece, Princess Margarida of Kandy, who was the eldest daughter of King Karaliyadde Bandara of Kandy. 

After his grandfather's death, he used to reside in the Colombo fortress instead of the Kotte Royal Palace.

After his conversion from Buddhism to Catholicism in 1565 he would bequeath (in 1580) his entire realm to the King of Portugal. The Portuguese takeover of Kotte, however, was resisted and would only be completed during the captaincy of Dom Jerónimo de Azevedo (1594 - 1612).

See also 
 List of Sri Lankan monarchs

References

External links 
 Kings & Rulers of Sri Lanka
 Codrington's Short History of Ceylon
 Dona Catherina: the last empress of Lanka
 Repression of Buddhism in Sri Lanka by the Portuguese (1505 - 1658)

Sinhalese kings
Monarchs of Kotte
1541 births
1597 deaths
House of Siri Sanga Bo
16th-century Sinhalese monarchs